Sir Roger Clarendon (c.1350–1402), was a royal bastard and conspirator, who was executed for treason.

Biography
Clarendon was a natural son of Edward the Black Prince, and his mistress, Edith Willesford. He was a paternal half-brother to Richard II of England. Being regarded as a possible pretender, Clarendon was hanged and beheaded by order of Henry IV of England in 1402. His execution was made the subject of one of the articles exhibited by Richard Scrope, Archbishop of York, against Henry IV during a rebellion in 1405.

Notes

References

 Endnotes:
Walsingham's Hist. Angl. (Rolls Ser.), ii. 249 ;
Trokelowe et Anon. Chron. (Rolls Ser.), 340;
 Eulog. Hist. iii. 389
Stubbs's Const. Hist. iii. 36, 49

1350s births
1402 deaths
Year of birth uncertain
14th-century English people
15th-century English people
15th-century executions by England
Children of Edward the Black Prince
English knights
Executed English people
Roger
Knights Bachelor
People executed by the Kingdom of England by hanging
People executed under the Lancastrians